Roger Lodge (born March 12, 1960) is an American TV game-show and sports-radio host and actor. He is known for hosting the syndicated dating show Blind Date. Lodge's acting credits include appearances on the ABC sitcom Full House; CBS's Yes, Dear; and UPN's The Parkers. He also appeared in the Tony Scott film The Fan and Not of this Earth. He hosts The SportsLodge on radio station KLAA AM 830, which is owned by the Los Angeles Angels baseball team and serves as their radio flagship station. He also hosts the Angels pregame show on AM 830 and the Angels Baseball Radio Network.

Life and career
Lodge was born as Roger Chavez' in Fontana, California, and raised in Lakewood, California. After his father left, Lodge's mother Helga married Robert Lodge and started using the last name Lodge. Lodge is the brother of retired homicide detective and California politician Steven Albert Chavez Lodge. Growing up, Lodge was a star basketball guard at Cerritos High School, where he was teammates with Ben Howland, and also played basketball at Whittier College. He played various minor roles in the entertainment industry for several years, most notably regular guest host for the program Talk Soup, on E! Entertainment Television. He also hosted his own half-hour weekly show for the Sci-Fi Channel, entitled S.F. Vortex, revolving around science-fiction news with roundtable discussions.  Lodge's acting credits include appearances on the ABC sitcom Full House, CBS's Yes, Dear, and UPN's The Parkers. He also appeared in the Tony Scott film The Fan and in Not of this Earth.

From 1999 to 2006, Lodge was the host of the syndicated dating show Blind Date, his best known role. In July 2007, he began hosting a new game show called Camouflage on GSN.

He has been the host of The Price Is Right Live! stage productions in Las Vegas, Nevada and Atlantic City, New Jersey. He also served as fill-in host for Jim Rome, on ESPN'S Jim Rome Is Burning in December 2007. He can be heard hosting The Sports Lodge every afternoon on AM 830 KLAA. Lodge also appeared on That's So Raven. He also did a sport segment for the KTLA Morning News, until June 2012, when KTLA chose to end its relationship with AM 830.

From 2003 to 2005, Lodge hosted a local sports talk radio show on KMPC 1540 AM, "The Ticket", based in Santa Monica, California.  Lodge is also a frequent guest on the ESPN show, Jim Rome Is Burning.  Lodge also occasionally guest-hosts The Jim Rome Show on radio.  In 2004, he hosted the ESPN game show ESPN Trivial Pursuit.  In late 2005, Lodge joined station KLAC (AM 570 Sports) as a fill-in host. He also serves as the play-by-play announcer for the Gender Bowl.

Lodge won the Celebrity 3-Point Shootout during NBA All-Star Weekend, both in 2004 and 2005.

He hosts The SportsLodge on radio station KLAA AM 830, which is owned by the Los Angeles Angels baseball team and serves as their radio flagship station. He also hosts the Angels pregame show on AM 830 and the Angels Baseball Radio Network. Lodge also hosted the television show Celebridate which aired on Mark Cuban's HDnet TV.

He has made several appearances on truTV's The Smoking Gun Presents: World's Dumbest... as a commentator.  He is also the host of Talk the Talk, on Reelz Channel. Lodge often filled in for Jim Rome on both since-cancelled CBS Sports Network shows Rome and Leadoff. In 2021, he appeared in a commercial for Noble Gold.

Selected filmography

Film

Television

References

External links

The Sports Lodge

1960 births
Living people
People from Cerritos, California
People from Fontana, California
Whittier Poets men's basketball players
American game show hosts
American radio personalities
American sports announcers